The Order of Victory of Socialism was the highest distinction in the Socialist Republic of Romania. This socialist order had no knights but rather several degrees. The 2nd degree was decorated with diamonds and gave the owner the right to bear the title of Hero of the Socialist Republic of Romania.

Description 
It consists of a five-pointed partially enamelled star of silver and bronze. The rays of the star are decorated with gilded points. The center of the star is decorated by a red or orange enamel wreath with teeth on the inside and a laurel wreath. The two flags below are those of the Communist Party of Romania and the Romanian tricolour. Inside the wreath is a medallion with a map of Romania, a burning torch and the letter V for "Victoria" (Victory).

List of recipients 
 
  Nicolae Ceaușescu (1971, 1978 and 1988)
  Josip Broz Tito (1972)
  Zaharia Stancu (1972)
  Dolores Ibárruri (1975)
  Leonid Brezhnev (1981)
  Erich Honecker (1987)
  Gustáv Husák (1988)
  Kim Il-sung (1987)

References 

Military awards and decorations of Romania
Orders, decorations, and medals of Romania
1971 establishments in Romania
1989 disestablishments in Romania
Socialist Republic of Romania